The 1860 Omata by-election was a by-election held  on 16 April in the  electorate in Taranaki during the 2nd New Zealand Parliament.

The by-election was caused by the resignation of the incumbent, Alfred William East.

He was replaced by James Crowe Richmond.

Richmond was the only nomination, so was declared elected unopposed.

References 

 

Omata, 1860
1860 elections in New Zealand
April 1860 events
Politics of Taranaki